Ornithonyssus is a mite genus of the family Macronyssidae.

Species
 Ornithonyssus acrobates Micherdzinski & Domrow, 1985
 Ornithonyssus africanus (Zumpt & Till, 1958)
 Ornithonyssus bacoti (Hirst, 1913) commonly known as the tropical rat mite.  A frequently occurring rat mite  that has a painful bite.
 Ornithonyssus benoiti Till, 1982

 Ornithonyssus bursa (Berlese, 1888) commonly known as the tropical fowl mite.

 Ornithonyssus campester Micherdzinski & Domrow, 1985
 Ornithonyssus capensis Shepherd & Narro, 1983
 Ornithonyssus conciliatus (Radovsky, 1967)
 Ornithonyssus costai Micherdzinski, 1980
 Ornithonyssus dasyuri Domrow, 1983
 Ornithonyssus desultorius (Radovsky, 1966)
 Ornithonyssus flexus (Radovsky, 1967)
 Ornithonyssus garridoi de-la-Cruz, 1981
 Ornithonyssus hypertrichus Radovsky, 2007
 Ornithonyssus jayanti (Advani & Vazirani, 1981)
 Ornithonyssus kochi (Fonseca, 1948)
 Ornithonyssus latro Domrow, 1963
 Ornithonyssus longisetosus Micherdzinski, 1980
 Ornithonyssus lukoschusi Micherdzinski, 1980
 Ornithonyssus matogrosso (Fonseca, 1954)
 Ornithonyssus noeli de-la-Cruz, 1983
 Ornithonyssus nyctinomi (Zumpt & Patterson, 1951)
 Ornithonyssus petauri Micherdzinski, 1980
 Ornithonyssus pereirai (Fonseca, 1935)
 Ornithonyssus pipistrelli (Oudemans, 1904)
 Ornithonyssus praedo Domrow, 1971
 Ornithonyssus roseinnesi (Zumpt & Till, 1953)
 Ornithonyssus simulatus Micherdzinski, 1980
 Ornithonyssus spinosa Manson, 1972
 Ornithonyssus stigmaticus Micherdzinski & Domrow, 1985
 Ornithonyssus sylviarum (G.Canestrini & Fanzago, 1877) commonly known as the northern fowl mite.
 Ornithonyssus taphozous Micherdzinski & Domrow, 1985

References

Mesostigmata
Parasites of birds
Acari genera